Maria of Anjou (1290 – end of April 1346/January 1347) was a member of the Capetian House of Anjou who served as Queen of Majorca during her marriage to King Sancho of Majorca. She was the daughter of King Charles II of Naples and his wife, Mary of Hungary.

Maria married King Sancho by proxy at Palma de Majorca on 20 September 1304 and in person in 1308. The marriage produced no children, which threatened the survival of the young independent state. Sancho willed the kingdom to his nephew James to prevent it from falling to the Crown of Aragon, and died in 1324.

Two years after Sancho's death, Maria married James of Ejerica, a member of the House of Barcelona. She was imprisoned in Jerica in 1331 by King Alfonso IV of Aragon, and was later transferred to Valencia. Her brother, King Robert of Naples, arranged her release, and she left Valencia after June 1337 for Barjols in Provence. Maria died childless in 1346 or 1347.

Ancestry

References

Sources

|-

1290 births
1340 deaths
Capetian House of Anjou
Majorcan queens consort
Consorts of Montpellier
Daughters of kings